Atlantis is a British fantasy-adventure television programme inspired by Greek mythology and created by Johnny Capps and Julian Murphy with Howard Overman. It premiered on 28 September 2013 on BBC One. In the show, submarine pilot Jason washes up on the shores of legendary Atlantis and must navigate the powerful leaders of the mythological realm.

Atlantis was the biggest new Saturday night drama series launch across all BBC channels since 2006, even up on the launch of hit show Merlin. It also managed to draw 1 million viewers away from the highly popular ITV show The X Factor, which aired at the same time in the UK.

On 26 October 2013, BBC One ordered a second series of the show, which began airing on 15 November 2014. On 23 January 2015, it was announced that the series had been cancelled.

Plot
In the modern day, Jason, the protagonist of the show, pilots a one-man submarine to investigate a deep sea disturbance that resulted in the disappearance of his father when he was a child. When he discovers the location, the submarine begins to fail and he is pulled into white light. He wakes up on the shores of the kingdom of Atlantis, which is ruled by a traditionalist, King Minos and his power-hungry, manipulative wife, Queen Pasiphae.

Under a set of circumstances, he is given shelter by a couple of unlucky and largely unemployed locals: Pythagoras — a young intellectual who enjoys beautiful triangles — and the rotund, ex-prize fighter Hercules — a hopeless romantic who spends most of his time in taverns drinking and gambling. The three of them encounter monsters, gods and demigods, as they live the Greek myths and battle to do good and protect the innocent. Along the way, they pick up some allies including Medusa, a palace maid; Ariadne, daughter of the King and heir to the throne; and a mysterious Oracle, who seems unsurprised at Jason's arrival. The Oracle predicts a world-changing destiny is in store for Jason if he stays on the right path.

Cast

Main 
 Jack Donnelly as Jason
 Mark Addy as Hercules
 Robert Emms as Pythagoras
 Aiysha Hart as Ariadne
 Sarah Parish as Pasiphae
 Juliet Stevenson as the Oracle
 Jemima Rooper as Medusa
 Amy Manson as Medea

Recurring

Ken Bones as Melas, son of Poseidon and High Priest
John Hannah as Tychon / Aeson
Robert Lindsay as Daedalus
Joseph Timms as Icarus
Gary Oliver as Alytarch
Series 1
Hannah Arterton as Korinna
Lou Broadbent as Ione
Lucy Cohu as Circe
Joe Dixon as Ramos
Alexander Siddig as King Minos
Oliver Walker as Heptarian
Ciarán Griffiths as Cyrus
Nora-Jane Noone as Atalanta

Series 2
Thomas Coombes as Critias
Lorcan Cranitch as Cilix
Peter de Jersey as Goran
Amy Manson as Medea
Ronald Pickup as Orpheus
Robert Pugh as Sarpedon
Vincent Regan as Dion, Ariadne's general
Emmett J. Scanlan as Delmos
Clive Standen as Telemon, an exiled prince of Aegina
Anya Taylor-Joy as Cassandra
Sian Thomas as Eurydice, the wife of Orpheus

Episodes

Series 1 (2013)

Series 2 (2014–15)

Production
Announced on 11 February 2013, Atlantis was created to fill the gap left behind by Merlin, a show that was created and produced by Johnny Capps and Julian Murphy. This duo, plus Misfits creator Howard Overman, produced Atlantis through their new company Urban Myth Films. Executive producer for BBC Cymru Wales was Bethan Jones. The drama series was commissioned by Ben Stephenson, Controller of BBC Drama, and Danny Cohen, Controller of BBC One. The cast was announced on 27 March 2013.

The series was filmed in Wales and Morocco. A 155,000sq ft warehouse, a former cold store building near Chepstow, was converted into a vast TV studio to house the sets and filming of Atlantis. The first series was filmed between 1 April 2013 and 1 November 2013.

On 22 July 2013, BBC America announced that the channel was co-producing Atlantis, and the show was broadcast in the US in autumn 2013 as part of "Supernatural Saturday." Since that date the series was promoted using a viral marketing campaign, with official accounts on Twitter, Tumblr and Facebook. On 9 August 2013, the first poster for the series was revealed, and on 16 August 2013 the first teaser trailer for the series aired on BBC One. A week later on 23 August, a second teaser was shown where Jason (Jack Donnelly) appeared. On 29 August four new teasers were released featuring Jack Donnelly, Juliet Stevenson, Mark Addy and Robert Emms. On 7 September the first promotional pictures of the cast were revealed and on the same day, the first trailer for the series was aired before Strictly Come Dancing on BBC One. A week before the first episode, on 21 September, the first clip from the opening episode was released.

On 26 October 2013, the BBC confirmed that a second series had been commissioned. The second series had its initial read-through on 11 March 2014, with filming taking place from 17 March 2014 to 10 October 2014. On 3 April 2014, it was announced that Vincent Regan was joining the cast as Dion along with Amy Manson as Medea.Clive Standen, known from Vikings, guest-starred in an episode of the second series. Emmett J. Scanlan, known from Hollyoaks, revealed on his Instagram page that he was joining the second series.

Soundtrack
In December 2015, Silva Screen Records released the soundtrack to the second series on CD and digital download.  Composed by Stuart Hancock, the album features 30 tracks and 73 minutes of music score, with the final track, entitled 'Vision of the Future', incorporating Rob Lane's original series title theme. Reviewing this soundtrack release in Synchrotones, Pete Simons wrote "Stuart Hancock's Atlantis is a magnificent work... What is impressive about Atlantis is its big cinematic feel; along with its large orchestral performance...the score sounds vibrant and exciting in a way that many similar scores don't."

Broadcast
On 4 October 2014, the first teaser trailer for the second series was released, followed by the first official trailer on 29 October 2014. It premiered on 15 November 2014.

In Canada, the series airs on Space, premiering 12 October 2013, with the second series returning 15 November 2014. In the United States, the series premiered on 23 November 2013 on BBC America, with the second series returning 15 November 2014. BBCA aired the remaining six episodes of the cancelled series in June and July 2015 with the last episode, "The Queen Must Die," airing on 8 August 2015. In Australia, the series aired on Fox8. It was originally set to premiere on 30 March 2014, but did not premiere until 4 May 2014.

The second series was set to return on 26 April 2015, however, it was postponed until late 2015. In January 2015, the BBC confirmed that a new series was not to be commissioned, and on 16 May 2015, the series ended.

Notes

References

External links
 
Atlantis at the BBC's website

Atlantis on Facebook
Atlantis on Twitter
Atlantis on Tumblr

2010s British drama television series
2013 British television series debuts
2015 British television series endings
Atlantis in fiction
BBC television dramas
British adventure television series
British fantasy television series
Cultural depictions of Jason
Cultural depictions of Medusa
Cultural depictions of Pythagoras
English-language television shows
Greek and Roman deities in fiction
Television series about Heracles
Television series based on classical mythology
Television series set in ancient Greece
Works about Medea